Mehranan-e Heydari (also Romanized as Mehranān-e Ḩeydarī; also known as Mehranān-e Bālā) is a village in Susan-e Gharbi Rural District, Susan District, Izeh County, Khuzestan Province, Iran. At the 2006 census, its population was 131, in 25 families.

References 

Populated places in Izeh County